Vida  is an unincorporated rural village in northern McCone County, Montana, United States, located on Montana Highway 13 along the Big Sky Back Country Byway, approximately  south of Wolf Point, and  north of Circle.

History
At this location, Vida was known as Presserville until 1951, when the post office at a previous incarnation of Vida was moved to that town and Presserville's citizens agreed to change the town name to conform with the name under which the post office was registered.
 
Over the intervening decades, the population has dwindled significantly. At the 2000 census, the Vida area had a population of approximately 70 people. The post office remains active, however, along with a "one room schoolhouse" servicing northern McCone County and covering grades PK through 8, two Christian churches (one Catholic, one Protestant), two grain elevators, a convenience store, and a gas station.

Vida is a part of a census-designated place (CDP) which bears the village's name and which was identified in 1980 or later.

Vida is also the boyhood home of ten time Montana sportscaster of the year Rocky Erickson.

Demographics

Climate
According to the Köppen Climate Classification system, Vida has a semi-arid climate, abbreviated "BSk" on climate maps.

References

Unincorporated communities in McCone County, Montana
Unincorporated communities in Montana
Census-designated places in McCone County, Montana
Census-designated places in Montana